The Qatar Exoplanet Survey, also known as QES, is an international exoplanet search survey based in Qatar. Its main goal is to detect exoplanets using the transit method, which is observing the light curve of the host star.

History 
This survey has a site in New Mexico, which was a collaboration to find small planets in the northern sky. Before it found its own planets, it detected WASP-36b and WASP-37b.

Site 
There is a telescope with 5 cameras, which are each 400m, which is also located in New Mexico. It has been operating since 2011 which occasional errors.

Results 
- In 2011, QES announced the discovery of  Qatar-1b, a hot Jupiter that has similar parameters to Jupiter.

- In 2016, QES discovered 3 massive planets, which are 4-6 times more massive than Jupiter. These planets are Qatar-3b, Qatar-4b, which is the largest, and Qatar-5b.

List 
This list is incomplete and needs more information.

Light green indicates it orbits one of stars in a binary system.

References 

Exoplanet search projects
Scientific organisations based in Qatar
Research in Qatar